Digraph may refer to:

 Digraph (orthography), a pair of characters used together to represent a single sound, such as "sh" in English
 (in Unicode) orthographic ligature, the joining of two letters as a single glyph, such as "æ"
 Digraph (computing), a group of characters used in computer programming to symbolise one character
 A directed graph, in graph theory
 Digraph, component of a CIA cryptonym, a covert code name
 As language codes in ISO 639-1
 Diagraph, a combination of a protractor and a scale ruler

See also
 Digraphia, use of multiple complete writing systems for one language.
 Digram (disambiguation) / Digramme
 Bigram
 Trigraph (disambiguation)
 Multigraph (disambiguation)
 Unigraph